John Mollo (18 March 1931 – 25 October 2017) was a British costume designer and book author, most known for his Oscar-winning costume design for the Star Wars film series. He was the older brother of Andrew Mollo.

Biography
Mollo was born in London on 18 March 1931. His father was Eugene Simonovitch Mollo, a Russian immigrant who had escaped Russia in the 1920s, and his mother was Ella Clara Mollo (née Cockell). Eugene Mollo had started his own company that specialised in spraying cement. He was a collector of tin soldiers and military insignia and he wrote a book, Russian Military Swords, 1801–1917. Eugene was also a noted illustrator, and some of his drawings are now held in the Victoria and Albert Museum in London. John Mollo followed his father's interest in military history and developed a particular interest in military uniforms from a very young age. He recalled being especially inspired when he saw the 1935 film Clive of India as a child and returned home from the cinema to draw the costume of King George II. John Mollo was educated at Charterhouse School and then went on to study at the Farnham School of Art in Surrey. After World War II, he was conscripted to do his national service in the King's Shropshire Light Infantry in Hong Kong.

Mollo's first marriage was to Ann Farquharson who worked as a set decorator on films such as Rob Roy (1995) and The French Lieutenant's Woman (1981). In 1968 he married Louise Pongracz. The son of this second marriage, Tom Mollo, served as a captain in the Coldstream Guards and as equerry to Queen Elizabeth II. 

He died on 25 October 2017, aged 86.

Career

Mollo's interest in military uniform shaped his career and he became a respected authority on European and American uniforms. He wrote several carefully researched books on European and American military uniform, including Uniforms of the American Revolution (1975) and Into the Valley of Death: The British Cavalry Division at Balaclava 1854, often in collaboration with his brother Boris and with illustrator Malcolm McGregor.

Mollo's specialist knowledge put him in demand as an advisor to war film productions. He was engaged as advisor for the movies Charge of the Light Brigade (1966), Nicholas and Alexandra (1971) and on Stanley Kubrick's Barry Lyndon (1975), ensuring the historical accuracy of the military uniforms worn by actors.

Mollo subsequently moved into costume design. For his first film, Mollo unexpectedly found himself working not on a historical military drama but in a genre he had no knowledge of: science fiction. He was commissioned in 1975 by a young filmmaker named George Lucas to devise uniforms and outfits for a fantasy space war film, Star Wars. When asked at the time by a friend about the project, Mollo said that he thought it was a "sort of a space western and one of the heroes is a dustbin". Lucas's project envisioned a cast of heroes battling an evil Galactic Empire, and he briefed Mollo to design costumes that would not resemble the stereotypical "spacey" look of earlier science fiction productions such as Flash Gordon — " I don't want the audience to notice any of the costumes. I just want to see light versus dark." The aim was to make Lucas's fantasy universe appear authentic – Mollo considered that his total ignorance of science fiction was advantageous in achieving this. Lucas provided Mollo with sketches and concept art by Ralph McQuarrie to work from, working McQuarrie's designs for Imperial stormtroopers and the malevolent character of Darth Vader into functional costumes for actors to wear. McQuarrie's image of Darth Vader had developed from Samurai armour, and Mollo built up a costume using a combination of clerical robes, a motorcycle suit, a German military helmet and a gas mask from Bermans and Nathans costumiers in Camden Town. Mollo intentionally designed the uniforms of Imperial officers to resemble German Nazi officers' uniforms; by contrast, the heroes of the film were dressed in costumes resembling Wild West outfits. One of Mollo's biggest challenges on Star Wars was to create a plethora of exotic aliens to feature in the Mos Eisley Cantina scene. Mollo worked with George Lucas to compile a chart of visual designs for a range of character types. He collaborated with make-up artist Stuart Freeborn, who designed the masks and prosthetics to match each of the costumes, along with Doug Beswick, Rick Baker and Phil Tippett.

Mollo was surprised by the success of Star Wars, and in 1978 he won an Academy Award for Costume Design. In his acceptance speech at the Oscars ceremony, he said that the Star Wars costumes were "really not so much costumes as a bit of plumbing and general automobile engineering."

Mollo went on to work as advisor on more conventional military films such as Zulu Dawn. He also designed costumes for the crew of the Nostromo spacecraft in Ridley Scott's  Alien (1979), and he returned to the Star Wars universe to work with Irvin Kershner on the 1980 sequel, The Empire Strikes Back. His work on Richard Attenborough's Gandhi (1983) involved designing historically accurate British military uniforms as well as Ben Kingsley's loincloth for the title role, and for this production he won his second Oscar, jointly with Bhanu Athaiya. Mollo's other credits include Greystoke: The Legend of Tarzan, Lord of the Apes (1984), Attenborough's Cry Freedom (1987), and Chaplin (1992).

Costume design

Films
Mollo's film credits include:
 Star Wars (1977)
 Alien (1979)
 The Empire Strikes Back (1980)
 Outland (1981)
 Gandhi (1982)
 The Lords of Discipline (1983)
 Greystoke: The Legend of Tarzan, Lord of the Apes (1984)
 King David (1985)
 Revolution (1985)
 Cry Freedom (1987)
 Hanna's War (1988)
 White Hunter Black Heart (1990)
 Air America (1990)
 Chaplin (1992)
 The Three Musketeers (1993)
 The Jungle Book (1994)
 Event Horizon (1997)

Awards and nominations
 two Academy Awards
 1978: Star Wars
 1983: Gandhi (together with Bhanu Athaiya)
 three Saturn Award nominations, won one
 1978: Star Wars
 five BAFTA Award nominations
 three Emmy Award nominations

Publications 
Mollo's books documented the history of military uniform in particular theatres of war such as the American Revolution, the Seven Years' War and the Crimean War.

 Illustrated by Malcolm McGregor.
 Illustrated by Malcolm McGregor
 Illustrated by Bryan Fosten

See also

 List of Star Wars artists
 List of military writers
 Military history

References

Further reading

External links
 

1931 births
2017 deaths
Artists from London
English costume designers
English people of Russian descent
Best Costume Design Academy Award winners
People educated at Charterhouse School
English military historians